Trent Estatheo (born 10 May 1981 in Maitland, New South Wales) is an Australian former professional rugby league footballer who played in the 2000s. He played for the Newcastle Knights in 2002.

External links
http://www.rugbyleagueproject.org/players/Trent_Estatheo/summary.html

1981 births
Living people
Australian rugby league players
Newcastle Knights players
Rugby league players from Maitland, New South Wales
Rugby articles needing expert attention